Charles Sherman King (September 14, 1865 – July 18, 1908) was an American football coach. He served as the fourth head football coach at Wabash College in Crawfordsville, Indiana, and he held that position for the 1889 season. His record at Wabash was 1–1.  King was killed, along with wife and two daughters, on July 18, 1908, when a train stuck their automobile near Columbia City, Indiana.

Head coaching record

References

External links
 

1865 births
1908 deaths
Wabash Little Giants football coaches
Yale University alumni
People from Wabash, Indiana
Sportspeople from Indiana
Railway accident deaths in the United States
Road incident deaths in Indiana